Governor of São Paulo is the position of the head of state and government of São Paulo, Brazil.

Line of succession 
According to Article 40 of the State Constitution, the line of succession is as follows:

 Vice-Governor
 President of the Legislative Assembly
 President of the State Court of Justice

Governors in the Republican period (1889–1985)

The New Republic (1985–present)

References

External links
Official list

São Paulo
Governors